Philippe Louis Edmé Marie François Erulin (5 July 193226 September 1979) was a senior officer in the French Army. He came from a family of renowned officers and military traditions.

He is best known as the Colonel Commandant of the 2nd Foreign Parachute Regiment 2e REP, who directed the military intervention in Zaïre against the Katanga rebels responsible for several massacres. It was the success in the Battle of Kolwezi which resulted in the liberation of the majority of the Katanga rebels' hostages. However, Erulin was later accused of having used torture during the Algeria War; an accusation that remains unsubstantiated and controversial.

Biography

Family 

His grandfather, Lieutenant-colonel Louis-Joseph Erulin, as well as his father, Lieutenant-colonel André Erulin, were both officers, both having graduated from Saint-Cyr, having each served in a World War. His father received the Croix de Guerre 1939-1945, Croix de guerre des théâtres d'opérations extérieures, Resistance Medal with rosette, and the Commandeur of the Legion of Honour, then died in Indochina in 1951 at the head of Mobile Group 4 under the orders of Général Jean de Lattre de Tassigny who stated while presiding over pronouncing the Military Honours:

His brother Dominique stated that his parents gave them a very strict education, and that at the death of his father, Philippe Erulin inherited a part of the family responsibilities.

Military career

Officer of the  1er RCP 

Engaged for 8 years at the ESMIA promotion « French Union » on September 29, 1952, Philipe Erulin followed the course of the school of infantry application until January 1955. He was assigned to the 1e RCP from 1954 to 1959 at Bône then Philippeville  with the rank of lieutenant.

He was assigned to the 6th company of the 153rd Motorized Infantry Regiment 153e RIM at Bône Algeria and assumed the commandment of that latter on June 1, 1962. The 153e RIM, repatriated from Algeria became mechanized and garrisoned at Mutzig on January 4, 1963.

He participated at the corps of this regiment to the Algerian War and Operation Musketeer. In Algeria, he directed a section which combat engaged notably in the Aurès and in Kabylie. He was wounded twice out of which one was serious, and was cited 4 times. He was made a Chevalier of the Legion of Honor at the age of 26.

He participated to the Battle of Algiers in which his regiment was engaged in 1957. He was with André Charbonnier, one of the two officers that stopped Maurice Audin, Algerian militant communist whose party was engaged in the armed struggle with the FLN, on June 10, 1957.

On July 1, 1964, he joined the general staff headquarters of the 6th Mechanized Brigade.

Destined for a tour deployment overseas, he was assigned as a quality chief at the operations bureau of the 3rd Foreign Infantry Regiment 3e REI at Diego Suarez on August 2, 1966, as well as the general staff headquarters of the regiment.
He was promoted to the rank of chef de bataillon on July 1, 1968.
Repatriated by end of tour on August 12, 1968, he was assigned to the ninth administrative regional company.

In November, he joined the inspection of the infantry then integrated the 84th promotion of the Superior War School on September 1, 1970.

Controversy on assumed acts of torture 

Henri Alleg, a communist militant, director of Alger républicain, stopped right after Audin in the same operation, accused Charbonnier and Erulin of having tortured him under the orders of Captain Roger Faulques. He published in 1958 La Question, a testimony denouncing torture during the Algerian war of independence. On the services which were applicable on him, Henri Alleg talked about a « torturing lieutenant », trying to refer to Philippe Erulin.

Pierre Vidal-Naquet reported the testimony of Georges Hadjad, another communist militant, who was trying to confirm having seen  « lieutenant Erulin » and other officers with Audin in the space where the latter was tortured. All denied torture.

In 1978, the guest of the television broadcast Les Dossiers de l'écran, René Andrieu, also editor chief of L'Humanité, profited from the resounding of Operation Kolwezi, to accuse Philippe Erulin to have been the torturer of Henri Alleg, the latter, still insisting as mentioned in his book. The Ministre de la Défense Yvon Bourges, announced in a statement that he was scandalized by the behavior of René Andrieu, while the rescue intervention in Shaba was still on going in action. A little later, Jean Planchais profited from the death of Colonel Philipe Erulin to criticize the amnesty and silence on the torture during that war. René Andrieu was condemned for defamation (without compensation for the offence of, the Court, establishing accordingly case-law), and the affair inspired the film A Captain's Honor. The family of Colonel Erulin launched accordingly several legal accusations while winning some.

In 2014, Jean-Charles Deniau, who obtained the undisclosed topics of général Paul Aussaresses confirmed that Audin and Alleg were tortured, but did not cite or mention Philipe Erulin as a torturer of these last two.

Commandant of the 2e REP 

On July 9, 1976, Philipe Erulin assumed the command of the 2nd Foreign Parachute Regiment at Calvi with the designated rank of Colonel.

Battle of Kolwezi 

On May 17, the President of France Valéry Giscard d'Estaing decided on an operation on Zaïre where Katanga rebels were committing massacres and apprehending hostages.

Making his way out of Calvi with his regiment on May 19, 1978, after a transit in Kinshasa, he jumped spearheading 700 paratroopers organized in two waves on Kolwezi. The town which consisted of 2000  European civilians (principally Belgian and French), was liberated after violent combats with the rebels. The regiment endured the loss of 5 men, twenty legionnaires being wounded. On June 6, the President of Zaïre Mobutu Sese Seko gave the accolade to colonels Yves Gras (military attaché of Zaire) and Philippe Erulin: the Franco-Belge intervention equally permitted to consolidate his regime.

On June 7, they returned to Calvi. The following week, Valéry Giscard d'Estaing rendered them a visit to congratulate the operation during an arms ceremony at Bastia. Under his orders, during this battle, served notably Benoît Puga, Bruno Dary and Ante Gotovina, who according to L'Humanité,also served to drive Erulin. The same journal confirmed that his brother Dominique (who associated later with Ante Gotovina) participated to the battle, while the latter had already left the army, following the Algerian War.

Assigned to the general staff headquarters of the French Army EMAT on July 1978, he died on September 26, 1979 in Paris .

Hommages to the operation of Kolwezi 

Thirty years later, Valéry Giscard d'Estaing returned to Calvi and confirmed that the operation of Kolwezi has become a reference, a school for all, military and political directors, which would have to prepare what is referred today as exterior operations. The operation of Kolwezi is actually taught in military schools. For Jean Guisnel, this operation also marked the end of defiance of the political power towards the French Foreign Legion following the general's putsch.

Citations and homages 

Philipe Erulin was cited at the orders of the Armed forces, on July 17, 1978:

The Commandeur of the Légion d’honneur was personally awarded to him on September 29, 1978 by the President of the Republic Valéry Giscard d’Estaing.

On May 21, 2008, the President of the Republic Nicolas Sarkozy pronounced the following at the occasion of a commemorative arms ceremony marking 30 years of exterior operations in the Honor courtyard of the Invalides:

The extract by Général de division Jeannou Lacaze, Inspector of the Infantry, and future Chef d'état-major des armées (CEMA) during the pronunciation of Colonel Erulin's Military Honors:

State of service 

 September 29, 1952 - promotion Union française of the EMSIA
 February 1, 1953 - caporal
 April 1, 1953 - sergent
 October 1, 1954 - sous-lieutenant
 October 1959 to April 1960 - Infantry application school of Saint-Maixent (1st company, 2nd section)
 January 20, 1955 - assigned to the 1st Parachute Chasseur Regiment at Bône then Philippeville
 October 1, 1956 - lieutenant
 April 1, 1961 - captain
 June 1, 1962 - received the commandment of the 6th company of the 153rd Motorized Infantry Regiment
 1963 - 1964 - commandant of the 1st company of the 153rd mechanized infantry regiment - quartier Moussy at Mutzig
 July 1, 1968 - chef de bataillon
 October 1, 1973 - lieutenant-colonel
 July 1, 1976 - Colonel
 July 1, 1976 - received commandment of the 2nd Foreign Parachute Regiment 2e REP

Recognitions and Honors 

  Commandeur of the Légion d'Honneur (1978)
  Officier of the Légion d'Honneur (1975)
  Chevalier of the Légion d'Honneur (1959)
  Croix de la Valeur militaire (4 citations)
  Croix du combatant
  Overseas Medal with agrafe « Zaïre »
  Chevalier of the Ordre du Mérite Agricole
  Médaille commémorative du Moyen-Orient (1956)
  Médaille commémorative des opérations de sécurité et de maintien de l'ordre en Afrique du Nord with agrafe « Algérie » (1958)
  Insigne des blessés militaires (2 stars)
  Médaille de bronze de la Jeunesse et des Sports
  Croix de la bravoure militaire zaïroise avec palme (Cross of the military bravery of Zaire with palm)

See also 

Pierre Segrétain
Rémy Raffalli
Pierre Jeanpierre
Jacques Lefort, regimental commander 2nd Foreign Parachute Regiment 2e REP (1958)
Pierre Darmuzai, 2e REP (1960)
Saharan Méharistes Companies (méharistes sahariennes)
Paul Arnaud de Foïard 2e REP (1965)
Jeannou Lacaze,  2e REP (1967)
Bernard Goupil, 2e REP (1972)
Jean Brette, 2e REP (1974)
Bernard Janvier, 2e REP (1982)
Jean Louis Roué, 2e REP (1978)
Bruno Dary, 2e REP (1994)
Benoît Puga, 2e REP (1996)
Hélie de Saint Marc
Christian Piquemal

Bibliography 
 Zaïre : sauver Kolwezi, by Philipe Erulin, Édition Montbel (Photo album)

Sources and references 

1932 births
1979 deaths
People from Dole, Jura
French Army officers
French military personnel of the Suez Crisis
French military personnel of the Algerian War
Torture in Algeria
Commandeurs of the Légion d'honneur
Recipients of the Cross for Military Valour
Knights of the Order of Agricultural Merit